Lyulin (Люлин in Bulgarian Cyrillic) may refer to:
 Lyulin Mountain, in western Bulgaria, after which most others are named
 Lyulin (municipality), municipality of Sofia
 Lyulin Metro Station, a Sofia Metro station.
 Lyulin motorway, motorway linking Sofia and Pernik
 Lyulin, Yambol Province, village in Yambol Province
 Lyulin, Pernik Province, village in Pernik Province
 Lyulin Peak, peak on Livingston Island, Antarctica